Denisse Alejandra Orellana Betancourt (born 8 November 1996) is a Chilean footballer who plays as a defender for Club Universidad de Chile and the Chile women's national team.

International career
Orellana made her senior debut for Chile on 15 September 2017.

References

1996 births
Living people
Women's association football defenders
Chilean women's footballers
Chile women's international footballers
Universidad de Chile footballers